Atul Atmaram Gawande (born November 5, 1965) is an American surgeon, writer, and public health researcher. He practices general and endocrine surgery at Brigham and Women's Hospital in Boston, Massachusetts.  He is a professor in the Department of Health Policy and Management at the Harvard T.H. Chan School of Public Health and the Samuel O. Thier Professor of Surgery at Harvard Medical School. In public health, he is executive director of Ariadne Labs, a joint center for health systems innovation, and chairman of Lifebox, a nonprofit that works on reducing deaths in surgery globally. On June 20, 2018, Gawande was named the CEO of healthcare venture Haven, owned by Amazon, Berkshire Hathaway, and JP Morgan Chase and stepped down as CEO in May 2020, remaining as executive chairman while the organization sought a new CEO.

He has written extensively on medicine and public health for The New Yorker and Slate, and is the author of the books Complications: A Surgeon's Notes on an Imperfect Science; Better: A Surgeon's Notes on Performance; The Checklist Manifesto; and Being Mortal: Medicine and What Matters in the End.

On November 9, 2020, he was named a member of President-elect Joe Biden's COVID-19 Advisory Board. On December 17, 2021, he was confirmed as the Assistant Administrator of the United States Agency for International Development, and he was sworn in on January 4, 2022.

Early years and education
Gawande was born on November 5, 1965, in Brooklyn, New York, to Marathi Indian immigrants to the United States, both doctors. His family soon moved to Athens, Ohio, where he and his sister grew up, and he graduated from Athens High School in 1983.

Gawande earned a bachelor's degree in biology and political science from Stanford University in 1987. As a Rhodes Scholar, he earned an M.A. in Philosophy, Politics and Economics (PPE) from Balliol College, Oxford in 1989. He graduated with a Doctor of Medicine from Harvard Medical School in 1995, and earned a Master of Public Health from the Harvard School of Public Health in 1999. He completed his general surgical residency training, again at Harvard, at the Brigham and Women's Hospital, in 2003.

Political advocacy
As an undergraduate, Gawande was a volunteer for Gary Hart's campaign for the presidency of the United States. After graduating, he joined Al Gore's 1988 presidential campaign. He worked as a health-care researcher for Representative Jim Cooper (D-TN), who was author of a "managed competition" health care proposal for the Conservative Democratic Forum.  Gawande entered medical school in 1990 – leaving after two years to become Bill Clinton's healthcare lieutenant during the 1992 campaign.

Public service 
Gawande later became a senior advisor in the Department of Health and Human Services after Clinton's first inauguration. He directed one of the three committees of the Clinton administration's Task Force on National Health Care Reform, supervising 75 people and defined the benefits packages for Americans and subsidies and requirements for employers. But the effort was attacked in the press, and Gawande later described this time in his life as frustrating, saying that "what I'm good at is not the same as what people who are good at leading agencies or running for office are really good at."

Gawande led the "Safe surgery saves lives checklist" initiative of the World Health Organization, which saw around 200 medical societies and health ministries collaborating to produce a checklist, which was published in 2008, to be used in operating theaters. The Lancet welcomed the checklist as "a tangible instrument to promote safety", adding "But the checklist is not an end in itself. Its real value lies in encouraging communication among teams and stimulating further reform to bring a culture of safety to the very centre of patients' care."

Journalism
Soon after he began his residency, his friend Jacob Weisberg, editor of Slate, asked him to contribute to the online magazine. Several articles by Gawande were published in The New Yorker, and he was made a staff writer for that publication in 1998.

In January 1998, Gawande published an article in Slate "Partial truths in the partial-birth-abortion debate: Every abortion is gross, but the technique is not the issue" discussing how abortion policy should "hinge on the question of when the fetus first becomes a perceiving being" and "not on techniques at all or even on when the fetus can survive outside the womb". 

A June 2009 New Yorker essay by Gawande compared the health care of two towns in Texas to show why health care was more expensive in one town compared to the other. Using the town of McAllen, Texas, as an example, it argued that a corporate, profit-maximizing culture (which can provide substantial amounts of unnecessary care) was an important factor in driving up costs, unlike a culture of low-cost high-quality care as provided by the Mayo Clinic and other efficient health systems.

The article "made waves" by highlighting the issue, according to Bryant Furlow in Lancet Oncology. It was cited by President Barack Obama during Obama's attempt to get health care reform legislation passed by the United States Congress. According to Senator Ron Wyden, the article "affected [Obama's] thinking dramatically", and was shown to a group of senators by Obama, who effectively said, "This is what we've got to fix." After reading the New Yorker article, Warren Buffett's long-time business partner Charlie Munger mailed a check to Gawande in the amount of $20,000 as a thank-you to Dr. Gawande for providing something so socially useful. Gawande returned the check and was subsequently sent a new check for $40,000. Gawande donated the $40,000 to the Brigham and Women's Hospital Center for Surgery and Public Health, where he had been a resident.

In 2012, he gave the TED talk "How Do We Heal Medicine?" which has been viewed more than two million times.

Books

Gawande published his first book, Complications: A Surgeon's Notes on an Imperfect Science, containing revised versions of 14 of his articles for Slate and The New Yorker, in 2002. It was a National Book Award finalist.

His second book, Better: A Surgeon's Notes on Performance, was released in April 2007. It discusses three virtues that Gawande considers to be most important for success in medicine: diligence, doing right, and ingenuity. Gawande offers examples in the book of people who have embodied these virtues. The book strives to present multiple sides of contentious medical issues, such as malpractice law in the US, physicians' role in capital punishment, and treatment variation between hospitals.

Gawande released his third book, The Checklist Manifesto: How to Get Things Right, in 2009. It discusses the importance of organization and preplanning (such as thorough checklists) in both medicine and the larger world. The Checklist Manifesto reached the New York Times hardcover nonfiction bestseller list in 2010.

Being Mortal: Medicine and What Matters in the End was released in October 2014 and became a #1 New York Times bestseller. It discusses end of life choices about assisted living and the effect of medical procedures on terminally ill people. The book was the basis of a documentary for the PBS television series "Frontline", which was first broadcast on February 10, 2015.

Later career 
Gawande chairs Lifebox, a non-profit founded in 2011 which provides training and equipment for safer surgery.

In June 2018, he was named the CEO for the new, Boston-based company, Haven Healthcare, formed by billionaire investor Warren Buffett, Amazon's Jeff Bezos, and JPMorgan Chase CEO Jamie Dimon. He stepped down from the position in May 2020, remaining as executive chairman while the organization sought a new CEO. In January 2021, Haven announced that it was to cease operations. According to CNBC, sources associated with the company claimed that "while the firm came up with ideas, each of the three founding companies executed their own projects separately with their own employees, obviating the need for the joint venture to begin with."

Biden administration
On November 9, 2020, he was named a member of President-elect Joe Biden's COVID-19 Advisory Board.

USAID nomination
On July 13, 2021, President Biden nominated Gawande for the post of Assistant Administrator of U.S. AID for the Bureau of Global Health. Hearings were held on Gawande's nomination in the Senate Foreign Relations Committee on September 29, 2021. Florida Senator Marco Rubio delayed Gawande's committee vote in October 2021, claiming, "Atul Gawande’s defense of infanticide is disqualifying... President Biden should withdraw Gawande's nomination and replace him with someone who is committed to upholding the agency's mission of saving lives." Senator Rubio's statement stems from a 1998 article Gawande wrote defending particular methods of late-term abortion and post-delivery infanticide. On November 3, 2021, the committee favorably reported Gawande's nomination to the Senate floor. The entire Senate confirmed Gawande on December 17, 2021 by a vote of 48-31.

Awards and honors 
In 2004, Gawande was selected as one of the "20 Most Influential South Asians" by Newsweek. In 2006, he was named a MacArthur Fellow for his work investigating and articulating modern surgical practices and medical ethics. In 2007, he became director of the World Health Organization's effort to reduce surgical deaths, and in 2009 he was elected a Hastings Center Fellow.

In the 2010 Time 100, he was included, in fifth place in the "Thinkers" category. The same year, he was he was included by Foreign Policy magazine on its list of top global thinkers. He was elected to the American Philosophical Society in 2012. In 2014, he presented the BBC's annual radio Reith Lectures, delivering a series of four talks titled The Future of Medicine. These were delivered in Boston, London, Edinburgh and Delhi. Also that year, he won the Lewis Thomas Prize for Writing about Science. In November 2016, he was one of three recipients of the Massachusetts Governor's Award in the Humanities for his contributions to improving civic life in Massachusetts. In May 2022 he was awarded an Honorary Doctor of Sciences by the University of Pennsylvania at their annual commencement ceremony.

Bibliography

Books 
 Complications: A Surgeon's Notes on an Imperfect Science. (Picador, 2002)
 Better: A Surgeon's Notes on Performance. (Picador, 2008)
 The Checklist Manifesto. (Metropolitan Books, 2009)
 Being Mortal: Medicine and What Matters in the End. (Metropolitan Books, 2014)

Essays and reporting

References

External links
Interviews and Talks
Charlie Rose – interviews 2007–2010
 The Daily Show – guest on February 3, 2010
Atul Gawande on Real Healthcare Reform and His New Book, The Checklist Manifesto – video report by Democracy Now!

 '' 30 Minute interview on his book, Complications.  With Hugh LaFollette, On "Ideas and Issues" WET-FM.

1965 births
Alumni of Balliol College, Oxford
American surgeons
American male non-fiction writers
American male writers of Indian descent
American medical writers
American people of Marathi descent
American Rhodes Scholars
Biden administration personnel
Harvard Medical School alumni
Harvard Medical School faculty
Harvard School of Public Health alumni
Harvard School of Public Health faculty
Hastings Center Fellows
Living people
MacArthur Fellows
New America (organization)
People from Athens, Ohio
People from Brooklyn
People of the United States Agency for International Development
Stanford University alumni
The New Yorker people
Writers from Boston
21st-century American physicians
Members of the National Academy of Medicine
American people of Indian descent
Indian scholars